Melnychuk is Ukrainian surname and a derivative of Melnyk

Alternative spellings: Melnichuk, Melnyczuk 

It may refer to:
Dmytro Melnychuk (born 1943), Ukrainian scientist
Maksym Melnychuk (born 1999), Ukrainian football player
Valentyn Melnychuk (born 1940),  Ukrainian men's basketball coach
Vasyl Melnychuk (born 1957), Ukrainian football referee

See also
 

Ukrainian-language surnames
Surnames of Ukrainian origin